Stornoway is the name of the official residence of the leader of the Official Opposition in Canada, and has been used as such since 1950. It is provided in recognition of the opposition leader's position. Located at 541 Acacia Avenue in the Rockcliffe Park area of Ottawa, Ontario. Stornoway has assessed value $4,225,000 (2008) (based on this value, which is only an approximation of the market value, the municipal property taxes are calculated) and is maintained with $70,000 a year in government funds. The property has been owned and managed by the National Capital Commission since April 1986.

It is located in an area which contains many ambassadorial residences.

History
The house was built by architect Allan Keefer in 1914 for Ottawa grocer Ascanio J. Major and was given the name "Stornoway" by the second occupants, Irvine Gale Perley-Robertson and Ethel Lesa Perley, after the ancestral home of the Perley family in the Outer Hebrides in Scotland.

During the Second World War, from summer 1941 to 1945, Mrs. Perley-Robertson offered Stornoway to (then) Princess Juliana of the Netherlands as a temporary home-in-exile for the Dutch Royal Family, including the future Queen Beatrix of the Netherlands.

Stornoway has served its present role as the Official Opposition leader's residence since 1950, when it was purchased by a group of concerned citizens and later transferred to the Government of Canada.

Although the Bloc Québécois were the official Opposition from 1993 to 1997, party leader Lucien Bouchard declined to move into the residence as a mark of protest against the federal government, choosing instead to live in nearby Gatineau, Quebec. His successor, Gilles Duceppe, also did not reside in Stornoway.

Following the 1997 election, when the Reform Party of Canada displaced the Bloc Québécois to become the largest opposition party, the new official Opposition leader, Preston Manning, declined to move in for a different reason: he protested that it was too extravagant and a waste of taxpayers' money, even joking that it should be used as a bingo hall to pay off the national debt. Manning asked that he be provided with a more 'modest' residence, but soon moved into Stornoway after his refusal to do so began to be portrayed in the media as a mark of disrespect for his position as the leader of the Opposition.

Renovations from 2002 to 2006 included an overhaul of the living room and kitchen, repair of the chimney, replacement of carpets, refinishing of hardwood floors, and painting, among other things.

Jack Layton, who had led the New Democratic Party to official Opposition status in the May 2, 2011 election, moved in a month later, but stated that he would continue to live in Toronto when Parliament was out of session. He died on August 22 of cancer; it was subsequently revealed that Layton and his wife Olivia Chow actually spent just one night in the house. His interim successor as NDP leader, Nycole Turmel, also did not formally move into the house, though she used Stornoway for entertaining purposes and slept over on occasion.

Of the leaders of the Opposition, John Reynolds, Bill Graham, Rona Ambrose, and Candice Bergen are the only interim party leaders to have resided at Stornoway; Bergen was the most recent resident after being selected as interim leader of the Conservative Party of Canada after Erin O'Toole was ousted as leader in a vote by Conservative MPs according to the terms of the Reform Act. All other residents have been permanent party leaders (ratified at a leadership convention).. Permanent Conservative leaders Andrew Scheer and Erin O'Toole moved in after their party elected them as leaders in its 2017 and 2020 leadership elections, respectively.

List of residents
Completed in 1914, the building had three occupants prior to its acquisition by the Government of Canada. Ascanio Joseph Major, a local grocer, was the original occupant of Stornoway, residing there from 1914 to 1923. In 1923, the Perley-Robertson family acquired the home. From 1941 to 1945, during the Second World War, the Dutch Royal Family leased the home from the Perley-Robertson family. 

In 1950, the building was acquired by a private trust, and later transferred to the Government of Canada. Since 1950, Stornoway has been used as the official residence of the leader of the official opposition in the House of Commons of Canada. Official opposition leaders (including interim leaders) who resided in Stornoway include:

George A. Drew 1950–56
Vacant, 1956–58 as John Diefenbaker did not move in during the six months he was Opposition leader and as Louis St. Laurent declined to use the house, due to his intending to step down as Liberal leader following his government's defeat 1957–58
Lester B. Pearson 1958–63
John Diefenbaker 1963–67
Robert Stanfield 1968–76
Joe Clark 1976–79
Pierre Trudeau 1979–80
Joe Clark 1980–83
Brian Mulroney 1983–84
John Turner 1984–90
Jean Chrétien 1990–93
Vacant, as the leaders of the Bloc Québécois refused to use the house 1993–97 
Preston Manning 1997–2000
Stockwell Day 2000–01
John Reynolds 2001–02
Stephen Harper 2002–06
Bill Graham February–December 2006
Stéphane Dion 2006–08
Michael Ignatieff 2008–11
Jack Layton May–August 2011 
Nycole Turmel 2011–12 
Tom Mulcair 2012–15
Rona Ambrose 2015–17
Andrew Scheer 2017–20
Erin O'Toole 2020–22
Candice Bergen February–September 2022
Pierre Poilievre 2022–present

Architecture
Stornoway is a 34-room mansion with eight bedrooms, five bathrooms, living room, sitting room (2nd floor), and dining room, and sits on extensive grounds.

Besides the residents in the home, Stornoway is served by a staff of three: a chef, chauffeur, and household administrator. Like 24 Sussex and Rideau Cottage the public is not allowed to visit Stornoway.

See also
 Rideau Hall
 24 Sussex Drive

References

External links
 Stornoway in the Directory of Federal Real Property
 Stornoway (at the National Capital Commission site)

1914 establishments in Ontario
Federal government buildings in Ottawa
Official residences in Canada
Houses in Ottawa
Heritage sites in Ontario
National Capital Commission